Yaychi may refer to:
 Yaychi, Ardabil
 Yaychi, East Azerbaijan
 Yaychi, West Azerbaijan